The Bet is a 1990 Polish drama film directed by Teresa Kotlarczyk. It was entered into the 17th Moscow International Film Festival.

Cast
 Jan Peszek as Director Wygon
 Grażyna Trela as Reporter Magda
 Pawel Królikowski as Tomek Koziel
 Krzysztof Kolberger as Group Tutor Marek
 Bartłomiej Topa as Andrzej Matlak
 Włodzimierz Musiał as Group Tutor Musial
 Mariusz Bonaszewski as Swir
 Robert Gonera as Mariusz
 Pawel Niczewski as Gigant
 Jaroslaw Gruda as Warchol
 Ryszard Kotys as Guard

References

External links
 

1990 films
1990 drama films
Polish drama films
1990s Polish-language films